Kambhampati Hari Babu is an Indian politician and the current Governor of Mizoram, being the first person from divided Andhra Pradesh and first Telugu person serving as Governor of Mizoram in North East India. He was a member of parliament to the 16th Lok Sabha from Visakhapatnam (Lok Sabha constituency), Andhra Pradesh. He won the 2014 Indian general election being a Bharatiya Janata Party candidate. He is former state unit President of Bharatiya Janata Party for Andhra Pradesh.

Early life 
Hari Babu was born in Prakasam district, Thimmasamudram. He moved to Visakhapatnam to pursue his B.Tech. in electronics and communication engineering in Andhra University. He completed his masters as well as Ph D from the same university. He later worked in Andhra University and voluntarily retired while working as Associate Professor in 1993 and later became active in politics.

Political career 
Dr. Hari Babu Kambhampati has been appointed Governor of Mizoram on July 6, 2021. Hari Babu participated in Jai Andhra movement in support of the creation of Andhra state as Student leader with Shri Tenneti Viswanadham, Shri Sardar Gouthu Latchanna and Shri Venkaiah Naidu. He served as the Secretary, Students Union Andhra University Engineering College during 1972-73. During 1974-1975, he actively participated in Lok Sangharsh Samithi Agitation under Loknayak Jaya Prakash Narayan and was arrested under Maintenance of Internal Security Act (MISA) during emergency and was imprisoned for 6 months in Visakhapatnam Central Jail and Mushirabad Jail. He served as AP State Executive Member of Janata Party during 1977 and AP State Vice President of Janata Yuva Morcha in 1978.

During 1991-1993, Hari Babu served as member of Andhra Pradesh State Executive Committee of the Bharatiya Janata Party and as the General Secretary for AP during 1993-2003. In 1999, he was elected as Member of Legislative Assembly from Visakhapatnam - I Constituency and was made the Floor Leader for the Bharatiya Janata Legislature Party, Andhra Pradesh in 2003. In March 2014, he was elected as the State President of BJP.

Election results

Development works 
Hari Babu uses his MPLADS funds with thrust on health, education, drinking water, and skill development. He has advocated transparency in utilization of MPLADS funds and focus on big, long-term projects that will help solve chronic problems. Some of these projects include providing toilets and furniture in all Government schools, drinking water in all areas not covered under GVMC.

To encourage people's participation, he conducted One MP - One Idea contest under the scheme.

References

|-

|-

India MPs 2014–2019
Politicians from Visakhapatnam
Living people
Lok Sabha members from Andhra Pradesh
1953 births
Bharatiya Janata Party politicians from Andhra Pradesh
Telugu politicians
Governors of Mizoram
Andhra University alumni
Andhra Pradesh politicians